Ben Manilla is an American broadcaster, audio producer, and teacher.  He has produced and directed award-winning radio programs.  His work in the late 1970s included the alternative news features, News Blimps, and music documentaries for WLIR, where he was production director and on-air personality.

In the 1980s, Manilla created news documentaries for WOR-AM, and helped develop programs at Radio Today, New York, including Flashback, Rock Stars with Timothy White, and Radio MTV.

In 1991, he moved to San Francisco and started Ben Manilla Productions which created national radio series including The House of Blues Radio Hour with Dan Aykroyd(with whom Manilla co-wrote the book Elwood's Blues: Interviews with the Blues Legends & Stars), Philosophy Talk with Stanford University, The Loose Leaf Book Company with Tom Bodett (syndicated to 227 stations with an audience of 250,000), and The Sounds of American Culture on National Public Radio's All Things Considered.

Manilla's awards include Columbia University's Edward Howard Armstrong Award, the 2003 International Radio Festival Grand Award, Billboard magazine's Best Syndicated Radio Show, and the RTNDA Edward R. Murrow Award.

In 2003, he formed the multi-platform production and consulting company Media Mechanics with broadcast veterans Mike Henry and Paul Marszalek.

Since 2005, Manilla has been an instructor at UC Berkeley Graduate School of Journalism where he teaches Radio News Reporting.

Manilla was born in 1952 to James Nicholson Manilla and Margarita Fernandez Manilla. He grew up in New York City and attended New York University, where he graduated with a drama degree. He now lives in San Francisco.

References

External links
Ben Manilla Productions
Media Mechanics
The Sounds of American Culture
The Bluesmobile

1952 births
American broadcasters
Living people